The Morgan 22 is an American trailerable sailboat that was designed by Charley Morgan  as a racer-cruiser and first built in 1968.

Production
The design was built by Morgan Yachts in the United States, from 1968 until 1971, but it is now out of production.

Design
The Morgan 22 is a recreational keelboat, built predominantly of fiberglass, with wood trim. It has a masthead sloop rig, a raked stem, a plumb transom, a transom-hung rudder controlled by a tiller and a fixed stub keel with a retractable centerboard. It displaces  and carries  of lead ballast.

The boat is normally fitted with a small  outboard motor for docking and maneuvering.

The design has sleeping accommodation for four people, with a double "V"-berth in the bow cabin, drop-down dinette table that converts to a single berth in the main cabin and an aft quarter berth on the port side. The galley is located on the port side just forward of the companionway ladder. The galley is equipped with a two-burner stove, a top-loading icebox and a sink. The head is a marine toilet centered under the "V"-berth in the  bow cabin.

Operational history
In a 2010 review Steve Henkel wrote, "... the Morgan 22, Charlie Morgan's smallest racer-cruiser, compared to her comp[etitor]s is no match for space below, but on the other hand, we think she would be the clear winner in a round-the-buoys race against both the Bayfield 23 and the Montgomery 23, despite the Montgomery's 15-seconds-per-mile lower PHRF rating. (Sometimes the ratings just don't seem fair.) Best features: She is fast, weatherly, and easy to handle—three good reasons for new sailors to choose her as their first cruising boat. Her two-person dinette with removable table that converts the dinette into a berth is comfortable and useful as a chart table. Worst features: Her centerboard control pendant is
a Rube Goldberg affair, which needs periodic inspection and—almost always—eventual replacement."

See also
List of sailing boat types

References

Keelboats
1960s sailboat type designs
Sailing yachts
Trailer sailers
Sailboat type designs by Charley Morgan
Sailboat types built by Morgan Yachts